The 2002 DFB-Ligapokal was the sixth edition of the DFB-Ligapokal. Hertha BSC won the competition for the second consecutive year, beating Schalke 04 4–1 in the final, an exact repeat of the previous year's competition, although Huub Stevens, the Hertha coach, had been in charge at Schalke the year prior.

Participating clubs
A total of six teams qualified for the competition. The labels in the parentheses show how each team qualified for the place of its starting round:
1st, 2nd, 3rd, 4th, etc.: League position
CW: Cup winners
TH: Title holders

Matches

Preliminary round

Semi-finals

Final

References

DFL-Ligapokal seasons
Ligapokal